Echo Hills is an unincorporated community and a census-designated place (CDP) located in and governed by Clear Creek County, Colorado, United States. The CDP is a part of the Denver–Aurora–Lakewood, CO Metropolitan Statistical Area. The Evergreen post office (Zip Code 80439) serves the area.

Geography

Demographics

See also

Outline of Colorado
Index of Colorado-related articles
State of Colorado
Colorado cities and towns
Colorado census-designated places
Colorado counties
Clear Creek County, Colorado
Colorado metropolitan areas
Front Range Urban Corridor
North Central Colorado Urban Area
Denver-Aurora-Boulder, CO Combined Statistical Area
Denver-Aurora-Broomfield, CO Metropolitan Statistical Area

References

External links

Clear Creek County website

Census-designated places in Clear Creek County, Colorado
Census-designated places in Colorado
Denver metropolitan area